Alair Cruz Vicente (born 19 April 1981) is a Brazilian former professional footballer who works as a player-coach for German club Kickers Leer/Germania Leer II. He plays as a left-back.

Career
Born in Aracruz, Cruz Vicente started playing for Riachuelo before being noticed by Corinthians at a youth cup tournament in São Paulo as part of Desportiva Ferroviária. He eventually moved to the Netherlands, signing a youth contract with AZ on 13 April 1998 after the club had brokered a deal through agent Apollonius Konijnenburg.

Cruz Vicente would, besides AZ, play in the Netherlands for FC Volendam, SC Veendam and SC Telstar.

He left Telstar in January 2015, and returned to Brazil in order to work in his parents' coffee plantation. Cruz Vicente also began playing football again after a few years, signing with hometown club EC Aracruz in January 2018, who were competing in the Campeonato Capixaba Série B. After a conflict with management, he moved to Pau Brasil, a club playing in a local competition in an Indian reservation.

In August 2018, Cruz Vicente returned to the Netherlands to play for VV Nieuweschans in the Vijfde Klasse, the tenth and lowest tier of Dutch football, after having initially chosen to play for WVV Winschoten. In July 2019, he moved to German club VfL Germania Leer competing in the Landesliga Weser-Ems. After one season, where he made one official appearance, he moved to the Kickers Leer/Germania Leer II team where he took on a role as player-manager for the Kreisliga team.

References

1981 births
Living people
Brazilian footballers
Association football defenders
Eredivisie players
Eerste Divisie players
Desportiva Ferroviária players
AZ Alkmaar players
FC Volendam players
SC Veendam players
AGOVV Apeldoorn players
Sparta Rotterdam players
FC Den Bosch players
SC Telstar players
Esporte Clube Aracruz players
Brazilian football managers
Brazilian expatriate footballers
Brazilian expatriate football managers
Brazilian expatriate sportspeople in the Netherlands
Expatriate footballers in the Netherlands
Brazilian expatriate sportspeople in Germany
Expatriate footballers in Germany
Expatriate football managers in Germany